Hans-Christian Biallas (26 December 1956 – 27 February 2022) was a German politician and Protestant theologian. He was the president of the Klosterkammer Hannover of Lower Saxony.

Life 
Biallas attended schools in Soltau and Buxtehude, and then studied Protestant theology in Göttingen, Kiel and Amsterdam. He began work as a vicar in Preetz in 1981, and was from 1983 to 1994 pastor in Cuxhaven-.

Politics 
Biallas joined the CDU in 1992. From 1996, he was at times a member of the municipal council of Cuxhaven. From 1994 to 2011, he served as a member of the Landtag of Lower Saxony.

Klosterkammer Hannover 
The state government appointed him president of the Klosterkammer Hannover as of 1 June 2011, succeeding Sigrid Maier-Knapp-Herbst. He held the position until his death.

Private life 
Biallas was divorced and had three children. He died on 27 February at age 65.

References

External links 

1956 births
2022 deaths
20th-century German politicians
21st-century German politicians
Members of the Landtag of Lower Saxony
20th-century German Protestant theologians
21st-century German Protestant theologians
Christian Democratic Union of Germany politicians
Politicians from Hanover